Jasper Lefevere (born 13 July 1988) is a Belgian judoka. He competed at the 2016 Summer Olympics in the men's 66 kg event, in which he was eliminated in the first round by Zhansay Smagulov.

References

External links

 
 

1988 births
Living people
Belgian male judoka
Olympic judoka of Belgium
Judoka at the 2016 Summer Olympics
European Games competitors for Belgium
Judoka at the 2015 European Games
21st-century Belgian people